Pogorzelica may refer to the following places:
Pogorzelica, Greater Poland Voivodeship (west-central Poland)
Pogorzelica, Gmina Karnice in West Pomeranian Voivodeship (north-west Poland)
Pogorzelica, Gmina Rewal in West Pomeranian Voivodeship (north-west Poland)
Pogorzelica, Łobez County in West Pomeranian Voivodeship (north-west Poland)